Ardgartan is a hamlet, on the Cowal peninsula in Argyll and Bute, Scottish Highlands. It is located on the shores of Loch Long, at the bottom of Glen Croe.

Ardgartan lies within the Argyll Forest Park, which is itself within the Loch Lomond and The Trossachs National Park.

Ardgartan House
The house was used as a youth hostel run by the Scottish Youth Hostels Association and operated for 70 years until it was closed in 2002.

References

External links

 Argyll Forest Park - website
 Loch Lomond and The Trossachs National Park - website

Villages in Cowal
Highlands and Islands of Scotland